The umushanana (in plural: imishanana) is the traditional clothing dress of women in Rwanda and Burundi.  

It consists of a long skirt gathered at the hips, a bustier and a stole draped over one shoulder. The fabric, which can be of any color, is generally lightweight to accentuate the draping effect. 

Mushanana is now only worn for formal and ceremonial occasions such as weddings, church services or funerals, and by traditional dancers in both Rwanda and Burundi. 

Mushanana is also worn by the Bafumbira women from Kisoro
District in the Kigezi sub-region in the south-western part of Uganda.

References 

Folk costumes
Rwandan culture